Stephen Michael Cardwell (born August 18, 1950) is a Canadian retired professional ice hockey forward who played 53 games in the National Hockey League for the Pittsburgh Penguins.  He would also play 152 games in the World Hockey Association with the Minnesota Fighting Saints and Cleveland Crusaders.

Cardwell was born in Toronto, Ontario and played his junior ice hockey in Oshawa for the Oshawa Generals.

Career statistics

External links

1950 births
Living people
Canadian ice hockey forwards
Cleveland Crusaders players
Ice hockey people from Toronto
Minnesota Fighting Saints players
Pittsburgh Penguins draft picks
Pittsburgh Penguins players
Tucson Rustlers players
Djurgårdens IF Hockey players
Canadian expatriate ice hockey players in Sweden